Malcolm Metcalf (October 16, 1910 – May 5, 1993) was an American athlete. He competed in the men's javelin throw at the 1932 Summer Olympics and the 1936 Summer Olympics.

References

External links
 

1910 births
1993 deaths
Athletes (track and field) at the 1932 Summer Olympics
Athletes (track and field) at the 1936 Summer Olympics
American male javelin throwers
Olympic track and field athletes of the United States
Sportspeople from Springfield, Massachusetts
Track and field athletes from Massachusetts